Saleh M. M. Rahman, better known by his pen name Sezan Mahmud, is a Bangladeshi-born American writer, lyricist, columnist and physician-scientist. He was awarded the Shishu Academy Award in 1395 Bengali year (1988). He works as the Associate Dean for Equity, Inclusion, & Diversity, and Professor of Medical Sciences at the Frank H. Netter School of Medicine, Quinnipiac University. .

Professional life
He received his M.B.B.S (M.D.) degree in medicine from Sir Salimullah Medical College, under Dhaka University in 1992, M.P.H degree from Harvard University School of Public Health in 1997 and Ph.D. from University of Alabama, Birmingham, School of Public Health in 2001. He has completed his IDF fellowship in Endocrinology at Joslin Diabetes Center, Harvard Medical School. He was tenured full professor of Public Health at Florida A&M University and Clinical Research Professor of Medicine at Florida State University, Professor of Medicine and Interim Assistant Dean at the University of Central Florida College of Medicine.

Literature
Sezan Mahmud published his debut novel "AgniBalak" in 2009, well received by eminent writers and critics of contemporary Bengali literature. AgniBalak is translated by Fayeza Hasanat and published by Austin Macauley Publishers in 2020, entitled FIRE BORN. His book on the true, untold stories of Naval Commandos in the Bangladesh liberation war (1971), one of the first books on true stories of Liberation war, Operation Jackpot was translated into English and published in Amazon Kindle version. His contribution to popularize the history of liberation war of Bangladesh to youngsters is noteworthy. His juvenile novel based on the liberation war ('Moner Ghuri Latai', 1992) was retold in the full-length feature film "Gourob" directed by nationally awarded film director Harunur Rashid. His writing has been selected and included by Bangladesh Text Book Board since 1996 in the sixth grade along with the most eminent writers of Bengali literature.

Published books

Compilations
 Science Fiction Samagra, Vol. 1 (Sandesh Prokashon, 2019)
 Harvard er Smriti O Onny ek America (Oitijjho Prokashoni, 2016)
 Path Haranor Path, Column Samagra, Vol. 1 (Subarno Prokashoni, 2011)
 Science Based Adventure Samagra, Vol. 1 (Jhingeful Prokashoni, 2010)
 MuktiJuddher Kishor Rachana Samogra, Vol. 1 (Mawla Brothers, 2002) - a compilation of four novels/docu-novels based on the liberation war of Bangladesh

Novels and docu-novel on the Liberation war
Fire Born (English Translation) (Austin Macauley Publishers, 2020) 
 Ognibalak (Shahittya Prokash, 2009)
 
 
 MuktiJudhdher Shera Lorai, (Mohona Prokashoni, 1992) - a docu-commentary of the top ten strategic battles of the liberation war of Bangladesh
 Moner Ghuri Latai (Shahittya Prokash, 1992) - a juvenile novel based on liberation war of Bangladesh
 Kala Kuthuri (Mawla Brothers, 2002) - a drama-novel on the liberation war of Bangladesh and the collaborators

Science fiction
 Debdut Manush (Sandesh Prokashon, 2019)
 Manusher Modhdhe Manush (Bangla Prokash, 2014)
 Cosmic Sangeet (Bangla Prokash, 2014)
 Lethe (Biddhya Prokash, 2012)
 Ayuskal O Trimilar Prem (Abasor Prokashoni, 2010)

Short stories
 Haram O Onnyano Galpa (Mawla Brothers, 2011)
 Project Vutong Adhunikong (Agami Prokashoni, 2002)

Science-based adventure novels
 Tushar Manab (Iceman) (Shahittaya Prokash, 1994)
 Deep Pahare Atongka (Ankur Prokashoni, 1992)

Feature
 Bishsher Shreshtha Dosh Ovijatri (Shahittya Prokash, 1992)

Rhymes
 Chhoray Chhoray Science Fiction (Agami Prokashoni, 2010) -Collection of science fiction rhymes.
 Habijabi (1st edition, Dinratri Prokashoni, 1988, 2nd edition, Auninday Prokashoni, 1992, 3rd edition, Agami Prokashoni, 2010)- collection of juvenile rhymes
 Palte Shudhu Lebas (Shoilee Prokashoni, 1992) -Collection of political rhymes

Edited books
 Kishor Rahashshay Galpo (Dinratri Prokashoni, 1988)
 Nirbachito Kishor Rahashshay Galpo (Kakoli Prokashoni, 1992, Second edition, 2005)
 Chokh Firiye Dekhi (1992)

Filmography 
 Lashkata Ghar, a documentary film on the people called Dom (considered lower cast and untouchable) written and directed by Sezan Mahmud, has received 2014 Honorable Mention Award at the Richmond International Film Festival.
 Script for "Gourob" based on his novel "Moner Ghuri Latai", Directed by nationally awarded director Harunur Rashid, Produced by Bangladesh Shishu Academy (1998)

Awards in literature
 Bangladesh Shishu Academy Award, (1988)
 Our Pride Award (2005) given by Bangladesh-American Foundation Inc.

Awards in professional works
 Global Corporate Award in Science and Academia (2014)

References

External links
 সেজান মাহমুদের বই অনলাইন
 সেজান মাহমুদের প্রবন্ধ
 সেজান মাহমুদের বই অনলাইন
 Publishers of Bangladesh

Bengali novelists
Bengali writers
Harvard School of Public Health alumni
Living people
1967 births
University of Alabama alumni
Bangladeshi male novelists
Harvard University alumni
University of Dhaka alumni
Bangladeshi lyricists